Suhit Gosain (born 17 October 1985 in Bhopal, India) is an Indian pop-singer, actor, and performer. He was a contestant on Indian Idol 3, a reality musical show aired on Sony Entertainment Television, modeled on Pop Idol. He was a favourite of Alisha Chinai, who was a judge of the same show. He was a part of the F4 boy-band which also included- Abhishek, Parleen and Meiyang Chang. The band earned great public appreciation. F4 was also declared 'The Next Big Thing' on Channel V. Despite such popularity, the band presently exists no more. Suhit holds a Management Degree from Flame School of Management, Pune, Maharashtra, India. After stints with Media Companies like Reliance & Times of India Group, he spent some time with a Mumbai-based Event management Company viz. 7ty7 Entertainment. Presently, Suhit is associated with Geometry Global Encompass Private Limited, a WPP Group Company as a Conceptualiser. Being associated with Media set-ups, Suhit carries his creative passion in to his job assignments. He continues to create his own music at his home recording studio.

Modelling
Suhit featured in the famous 'Break to banata hai' introductory TV commercial of KitKat. This commercial was aired extensively on almost all Indian (Hindi & Regional) TV channels. Thereafter,  he has also featured in a TV commercial by NIIT, an IT Education Company, in 2009 and in Videocon D2H ad in 2010. His cute-boy image was featured in all the commercials.

Movies
Suhit has acted in one of the lead roles in the movie The Seventeens produced by Guerilla Flicks, a brand of Pritish Nandy Communications which is yet to hit the screens.

TV
REAL TV, a short-lived TV channel, launched a Music Reality show named Sitaron Ko Choona Hai, which is anchored by Suhit. His co-host is Sunanda Wong. This show had a former Indian Idol 3 contestant named Padmanav Bordoloi, who happens to be Suhit's best friend. The winner of this contest was amongst Top-10 in Indian Idol-5 season

References

External links
Interview: Suhit Gosain - Indian Idol With "Attitude" (Desicritics.org, 16 July)
 http://desicritics.org/2007/07/16/000506.php

F4 - Tu To Na Aai
 http://www.rkmania.com/album.php?album=F4+-+Tu+To+Na+Aai

1985 births
Living people
Indian male pop singers
Musicians from Bhopal
Singers from Madhya Pradesh